Borislav "Boro" Stjepanović (born 8 May 1946 in Vareš, SR Bosnia and Herzegovina, SFR Yugoslavia) is a Bosnian film, theater and television actor.

He has played in over 50 films since the 1960s, most notably in Sjećaš li se Doli Bel, Ko to tamo peva, Čudo neviđeno, Miris dunja, Kuduz, Gluvi barut, First Class Thieves, Oscar award winning Bosnian film No Man's Land and many others.

Stjepanović has also appeared in many television series and sitcoms like Viza za budućnost, Tata i zetovi, Naša mala klinika (Serbian version) and Lud, zbunjen, normalan.

Selected filmography

Film
Ko to tamo peva (1980), as The Bald Guy
Sjećaš li se Doli Bel? (1981), as Cvikeraš
Miris dunja (1982), as Alkalaj
Čudo neviđeno (1984), as Soro
Kuduz (1989), as Rudo
Gluvi barut (1990), as Luka Kaljak
No Man's Land (2001), as Bosnian soldier
First Class Thieves (2005), as Prison manager
Our Everyday Life (2015), as Aljo

Television
Viza za budućnost (2005–2008), as Aleksandar Jović
Tata i zetovi (2006–2007), as Žarko Bošnjak
Naša mala klinika (Serbian version) (2007–2011), as Dr. Guzina
Lud, zbunjen, normalan (2010–2011), as Dr. Đuro Ubiparip

References

External links

1946 births
Living people
People from Vareš
20th-century Bosnia and Herzegovina male actors
21st-century Bosnia and Herzegovina male actors
Bosnia and Herzegovina male film actors
Bosnia and Herzegovina male television actors